Dora is an unincorporated community and census-designated place (CDP) in Crawford County in the western part of the U.S. state of Arkansas.  It is located approximately three miles west of Van Buren on the Arkansas-Oklahoma border along Interstate 40. The community is part of the Fort Smith, Arkansas-Oklahoma Metropolitan Statistical Area. Dora shares its ZIP code (72956) and other municipal services with Van Buren.

It was first listed as a CDP in the 2020 census with a population of 121.

Dora had its start when the Kansas and Arkansas Railway was extended to that point.

Demographics

2020 census

Note: the US Census treats Hispanic/Latino as an ethnic category. This table excludes Latinos from the racial categories and assigns them to a separate category. Hispanics/Latinos can be of any race.

References

Census-designated places in Arkansas
Census-designated places in Crawford County, Arkansas
Unincorporated communities in Arkansas
Unincorporated communities in Crawford County, Arkansas
Fort Smith metropolitan area